The  is a limited express train service in Japan operated by West Japan Railway Company (JR West), which runs from Okayama to Yonago, Matsue and Izumo in Shimane Prefecture.

This limited express train connects Okayama with Yonago in 2 hours, Okayama with Matsue in 2 hours and 30 minutes, and Okayama with Izumoshi in 3 hours.

Rolling stock
 381 series EMUs (from July 1982 to 2023) (4-, 6-, or 9- car formations)

Former rolling stock
 KiHa 181 series DMUs (from March 1972, until July 1982)

Future rolling stock
 273 series EMUs (expected from spring 2024)

History

References

External links

 JR West Yakumo information 

Named passenger trains of Japan
West Japan Railway Company
Railway services introduced in 1959